Gennadiy Nikolaevich Nikonov (August 11, 1950 – May 14, 2003) was a Russian gun engineer.  His most famous accomplishments were probably as the designer of the AN-94 assault rifle, and the "straight-back bolt."  Nikonov held 44 Copyright Certificates, and was awarded the titles of "The Best Designer of the Company" and "The Best Designer of the Ministry." In memory of the outstanding designer, a memorial plaque on the building design and weapons center of "Izhmash" (2003), and at the place of his burial (2007).

Early life and education 

Nikonov was born in Izhevsk. His father and mother were employed at Izhmash, a Soviet arms factory. His father was a mechanic. Nikonov graduated from technical school in 1968. At Izhmash, he took evening classes. In 1975  he graduated from the Izhevsk Mechanical Institute certified as a gun engineer.

Design career 

He started work at Izhmash in the Department of the Chief Arms Designer. His first position was as a technician. In technical school, Nikonov became obsessed with underwater rifles. He won his first professional recognition by designing a trigger mechanism for an underwater rifle.

He designed various rifles, including air guns and sporting firearms. One of the most praised was the stylish, accurate "Izjubr" (Buck Deer) carbine – a limited edition luxury weapon. Nikonov was appointed as a senior project engineer to design single-shot bolt-action rifles and fully automatic weapons. In this assignment he patented a number of mechanisms and components. One of the most significant was the "straight-pull bolt," first used in a winter biathlon target rifle.

Nikonov also worked on research projects. In the middle 1970s he entered a post-graduate Ph.D course. From 1980 to 1985  he worked on projects for the Soviet Ministry for Defense Industry. Examples of his innovation include his twin-barreled machine gun and the "blow back shifted pulse (BBSP)" used on the AN-94. It is said that his high quality and quantity of work helped him advance to higher positions at work.

Nikonov machine gun
The weapon was developed on Nikonov's own initiative, from work connected with competitions and technical tasks. The weapon has no bolt, but a stationary breech and movable barrels, each with its own gas cylinders and pistons connected to the adjacent barrel. Upon firing one barrel, the next one is forced backwards, and thus causes the next barrel to move forward. Firing operates a feeding device that channels rounds into the barrels, with the spent cartridges being ejected from both sides. The barrels move back and forth the full length of the cartridge. The double-barreled design, in combination with the shortest possible stroke, allows for a high rate of fire at more than 3,000 rounds per minute. The prototype is now located the M.T. Kalashnikov museum in Izhevsk.

Personal life
He was married and had two sons, Nikolay and Yuri.  Tatiana, Nikonov's wife, works as an arms designer in the same bureau.

References

 "Эйнштейн, Чехов и Платон?!", Ружьё. Российский оружейный журнал. 1998/1, page 64
 "У Истоков «Абакана»", Ружьё. Оружие и амуниция, 1998/1, pp. 6–8
 Nowa Technika Wojskowa 2002-03/04.
 http://www.kalashnikov.ru/upload/medialibrary/b8c/15.pdf
 http://www.kalashnikov.ru/upload/medialibrary/110/042_046.pdf
http://alibudm.narod.ru/pis/pisuch.html 

1950 births
2003 deaths
Russian inventors
Firearm designers
Soviet engineers
20th-century Russian engineers
People from Izhevsk
Soviet inventors